The 1831 New Hampshire gubernatorial election was held on March 8, 1831.

Incumbent Democratic Governor Matthew Harvey resigned on February 28, 1831 to take up a seat on the United States District Court for the District of New Hampshire. President of the New Hampshire Senate Joseph M. Harper served as acting Governor for the remainder of Harvey's term.

Democratic nominee Samuel Dinsmoor defeated National Republican nominee Ichabod Bartlett with 55.57% of the vote.

General election

Candidates
Ichabod Bartlett, National Republican, member of the New Hampshire House of Representatives
Samuel Dinsmoor, Democratic, judge of probate of Cheshire County, former U.S. Representative, unsuccessful candidate for Governor in 1823

Results

References

Notes

1831
New Hampshire
Gubernatorial